Mattias Hubrich (born 26 May 1966) is an alpine skier from New Zealand.

He competed for New Zealand at the 1984 Winter Olympics at Sarajevo; and came 17th in the Slalom.

He competed for New Zealand at the 1988 Winter Olympics at Calgary; and came 22nd in the Slalom and 24th in the Super G but did not finish in the Giant Slalom.

He is a brother of 1984 alpine skier Markus Hubrich.

References 
 Black Gold by Ron Palenski (2008, 2004 New Zealand Sports Hall of Fame, Dunedin) p. 105.

External links 
 
 

Living people
1966 births
New Zealand male alpine skiers
Olympic alpine skiers of New Zealand
Alpine skiers at the 1984 Winter Olympics
Alpine skiers at the 1988 Winter Olympics